Rapid City is the second most populous city in South Dakota and the county seat of Pennington County. Named after Rapid Creek, where the settlement developed, it is in western South Dakota, on the Black Hills' eastern slope. The population was 74,703 as of the 2020 Census.

Known as the "Gateway to the Black Hills" and the "City of Presidents" because of the life-size bronze president statues downtown, Rapid City is split by a low mountain ridge that divides the city's western and eastern parts. Ellsworth Air Force Base is on the city's outskirts. Camp Rapid, part of the South Dakota Army National Guard, is in the city's western part.

Rapid City is home to such attractions as Art Alley, Dinosaur Park, the City of Presidents walking tour, Chapel in the Hills, Storybook Island, and Main Street Square. The historic "Old West" town of Deadwood is nearby. In the neighboring Black Hills are the tourist attractions of Mount Rushmore, the Crazy Horse Memorial, Custer State Park, Wind Cave National Park, Jewel Cave National Monument, and the museum at the Black Hills Institute of Geological Research. To the city's east is Badlands National Park.

History

The public discovery of gold in 1874 by the Black Hills Expedition, led by George Armstrong Custer, brought a mass influx of European-American miners and settlers into Rapid City. A group of unsuccessful miners founded Rapid City in 1876, trying to create other chances; they promoted their new city as the "Gateway to the Black Hills"; it was originally known as Hay Camp. The "Gateway" nickname is shared by neighboring Box Elder. In February 1876, John Richard Brennan and Samuel Scott, with a small group of men, laid out Rapid City. It was eventually named for the spring-fed Rapid Creek that flows through it.

The land speculators measured off a square mile and designated the six blocks in the center as a business section. Committees were appointed to recruit prospective merchants and their families to locate in the settlement. Such merchants soon began selling supplies to miners and pioneers. The city's location on the edge of the Plains and Hills and its large river valley made it a natural hub for the railroads that were constructed in the late 1880s from both the south and east. By 1900, Rapid City had survived a boom and bust and was developing as an important regional trade center for the Upper Midwest.

The Black Hills had become popular in the late 1890s, but Rapid City became a more important destination in the 20th century. Local entrepreneurs promoted the sights, the availability of the automobile for individual transportation, and construction of improved roadways after World War I led to many more tourists to this area, including President Calvin Coolidge and the First Lady in summer 1927. Coolidge announced that he would not seek reelection in 1928 from his summer office in Rapid City. Gutzon Borglum, already a noted sculptor, began work on Mount Rushmore in 1927, and his son, Lincoln Borglum, continued the work after Gutzon's death in 1941. The work was halted due to the US need to invest in buildup for its entry into World War II; the sculpture was declared complete in 1941. Although tourism had sustained the city throughout the Great Depression of the 1930s, gasoline rationing during World War II decimated such travel. But investments in the defense industry and other war-related growth stimulated the placement of new military installations in the area, bringing more businesses and residents.

In 1930, the Rapid City Chamber of Commerce sent a letter inviting Al Capone to live in the Black Hills. South Dakota's governor did not support the idea, and Capone declined.

In the 1940s Rapid City benefited greatly from the opening of Rapid City Army Air Base, later Ellsworth Air Force Base, an Army Air Corps training base. The local population nearly doubled between 1940 and 1948, from almost 14,000 to nearly 27,000. Military families and civilian personnel soon took every available living space in town, and mobile home parks proliferated. Rapid City businesses profited from the military payroll.

During the Cold War, the government constructed missile installations in the area: a series of Nike Air Defense sites were constructed around Ellsworth in the 1950s. In the early 1960s three Titan missile launch sites were constructed; these contained a total of nine Titan I missiles in Rapid City's general vicinity. Beginning in November 1963, the land for 100 miles east, northeast and northwest of the city was dotted with construction of 150 Minuteman missile silos and 15 launch command centers. They were all deactivated in the early 1990s.

In 1949, city officials envisioned the city as a retail and wholesale trade center for the region. They developed a plan for growth that focused on a civic center, more downtown parking, new schools, and paved streets. A construction boom continued into the 1950s. Growth slowed in the 1960s.

After the Black Hills Flood of 1972, the worst natural disaster in South Dakota history, a building boom took place over the next decade to replace damaged structures. On June 9, 1972, heavy rains caused massive flash flooding along Rapid Creek through the city, killing 238 people and destroying more than $100 million in property.

In response to this devastation, Rapid City received an outpouring of private donations and millions of dollars in federal aid. It was able to complete a major part of its 1949 plan: clearing the area along the Rapid Creek and making the floodplain a public park. In other areas, new homes and businesses were constructed to replace those that had been destroyed. Rushmore Plaza Civic Center and a new Central High School were built in part of the area that was cleared. The high school opened in 1978, with the graduating class that year attending classes in both the original school (housed in what is now Rapid City High School and community theater) and the new one.

The rebuilding generated construction and related jobs that partly insulated Rapid City from the drop in automotive tourism caused by the 1974 Oil Embargo, but tourism was depressed for most of a decade. In 1978, Rushmore Mall was built on the city's north edge, enhancing the city's status as a local retail center.

In 1980, the Supreme Court of the United States ruled in United States v. Sioux Nation of Indians that the federal government had illegally stolen the Black Hills from the Sioux people when it unilaterally broke a treaty guaranteeing the Black Hills to them. As a result, the federal government offered a financial settlement, but the Lakota Sioux declined on the principle that the theft of their land should not be validated. They still demand the return of the land. The settlement funds accrue interest. This land includes Rapid City, by far the largest modern settlement in the Black Hills. As of 2019, the dispute has not been settled.

In the 1980s, tourism increased again as the city hosted the annual Sturgis Motorcycle Rally; another decline occurred in the late 1990s. Fears that Ellsworth AFB would be closed under the BRAC review and base closure process in the 1990s and 2000s led to attempts to expand other sectors of the economy. Growth continued and the city expanded significantly during this period.

Today, Rapid City is South Dakota's primary city for tourism and recreation. With the federal government's approval of a Deep Underground Science and Engineering Laboratory at the Homestake Mine site in nearby Lead, Rapid City is primed for advancements in technology, medicine, and scientific research.

1972 Rapid Creek flood

On June 9–10, 1972, extremely heavy rains over the eastern Black Hills of South Dakota produced record floods on Rapid Creek and other streams in the area. According to the Red Cross, the resulting peak floods (which occurred after dark) left 238 people dead and 3,057 people injured. Total property destruction was estimated in excess of $160 million (about $964 million in 2018 dollars), which included 1,335 homes and 5,000 automobiles that were destroyed.

Runoff from this storm produced record floods (highest peak flows recorded) along Battle, Spring, Rapid, and Box Elder creeks. Smaller floods also occurred along Elk and Bear Butte creeks. Canyon Lake Dam, on the west side of Rapid City, broke the night of the flood, unleashing a wall of water down the creek. The 1972 flooding has an estimated recurrence interval of 500 years, which means that a flood of this magnitude will occur on average once every 500 years. Every year there is a 0.2% chance (1 in 500) that a similar event will occur. To prevent similar damage, the city has prohibited residential and business construction on its flood plain. Today the flood plain is used for civic functions such as golf courses, parks, sports arenas, and arboretums, based mostly on the landscape and temporary use by people.

In 2007, the Rapid City Public Library created a 1972 Flood digital archive that collects survivors' stories, photos and news accounts of the flood. The Journey Museum has an interactive display on the 1972 flood; this is an ongoing project to give future generations the best idea of how the people were affected and what changes the city made as a result of the major losses of life and property. Plans include the memorialization of all those who died from the flood by the preparation of individual biographies, so they may be remembered more fully.

Geography
The downtown elevation of Rapid City is 3,202 feet (976 m).

According to the U.S. Census Bureau, the city has a total area of 55.49 square miles (143.71 km2), of which 55.41 square miles (143.5 km2) is land and 0.08 square mile (0.2 km2) is water.

Rapid City is located on the eastern edge of the Black Hills, and has developed on each side of the Dakota Hogback. Rapid City's "Westside" is located in the Red Valley between the foothills of the Black Hills proper and the Dakota Hogback, so named for the red Spearfish formation soils and the way the valley completely encircles the Black Hills. Rapid City has expanded into the foothills, with developments having been built on both ridges and in valleys developed, especially in the last 20 years. This arid edge area has a higher risk of wildfire, as shown by the Westberry Trails fire in 1988.

Skyline Drive follows the summits of the Dakota Hogback south from near Rapid Gap (where Rapid Creek cuts through the Hogback) to a large high plateau that forms the current south edge of Rapid City. The Central and Eastern portions of Rapid City lie in the wide valley of Rapid Creek outside the Hogback. It includes a number of mesas rising a hundred feet or more above the floodplain.

Rapid Creek
Rapid Creek flows through Rapid City, emerging from Dark Canyon above Canyon Lake and flowing in a large arc north of downtown. It descends to the southeast where the valley widens. Since the flood damage of 1972, the city has prohibited most development in the floodplain of Rapid Creek. It has adapted this green space for public uses: a series of parks, arboretums, and bike trails, which have reconnected the city to the creek for residents.

To the north, a series of ridges separate Rapid Creek from Box Elder Creek. Both older and new residential areas and commercial areas have developed here, along I-90. To the south, the terrain rises more steeply to the southern widening of the Dakota Hogback into a plateau dividing the Rapid Creek drainage from Spring Creek.

Climate

Rapid City features a temperate semi-arid climate (Köppen: BSk) bordering on a hot-summer humid continental climate (Köppen: Dwa), and is part of USDA Hardiness zone 5b. Its location makes its climate unlike both the higher elevations of the Black Hills to the west and the Great Plains to the east. It is characterized by long arid summers and long dry winters, with short but distinct spring and autumn seasons.

Chinook winds can warm temperatures above , doing so on average about 20 times from December to February. Temperature inversions, however, occasionally produce warmer temperatures in the Black Hills. On average, highs do not climb above freezing on 43 days, while the low temperature reaches  on an average of 18 nights. Snowfall is frequent but usually not heavy; March and April are typically the snowiest months. The seasonal total averages , although historically ranging from  during 1980–81 to  during 1985–86. Measurable snow has occurred in every month except July.

Compared to locations in the east, the area warms rather gradually early in the year, with the last measurable snow typically occurring in late April and precipitation totals beginning to increase; May snow occurs several times per decade. Toward the middle of the year, storms typically develop over the Black Hills during the afternoon and move onto the plains in the evening. Only in April through June have calendar-day precipitation amounts exceeding  been observed. Rapid City has an average of twenty clear to partly cloudy days and 67% of its possible sunshine in June. This is the traditional "flood" season for Rapid and other creeks in the Eastern Hills. Temperatures warm rapidly as summer approaches.

Summer in Rapid City has relatively pleasant temperatures, and is relatively dry (following a wet spring), and relatively sunny. An average of 32 days reach + highs and 5 with + highs. Due to the elevation and aridity, lows rarely remain at or above  and during July and August fall to or below  on an average 7.6 days. Rapid City records an average of nine thunderstorm days in August, but only  of rain in that month.

Fall is a transition season: the average first freeze occurs in Rapid City on October 4 and in the Black Hills in late August through September. The Rapid City area's first snowfall is usually in October, although higher elevations sometimes receive significant snow in September. Occasional cold fronts moving through the area bring blustery northwest winds.

Sunshine is abundant in the region in all months except December, averaging 2850 hours, 64% of the possible total, per year.

Demographics

2010 census
As of the census of 2010, there were 67,956 people, 28,586 households, and 16,957 families residing in the city. The racial makeup of the city was 80.4% White, 1.1% African American, 12.4% Native American, 1.0% Asian, 0.1% Pacific Islander, 0.7% from other races, and 4.1% from two or more races. Hispanic or Latino of any race were 4.1% of the population.

There were 28,586 households, of which 29.9% had children under the age of 18 living with them, 41.2% were married couples living together, 13.1% had a female householder with no husband present, 5.1% had a male householder with no wife present, and 40.7% were non-families. 32.9% of all households were made up of individuals, and 11.1% had someone living alone who was 65 years of age or older. The average household size was 2.29 and the average family size was 2.90.

The median age in the city was 35.6 years. 23.9% of residents were under the age of 18; 10.6% were between the ages of 18 and 24; 25.7% were from 25 to 44; 25% were from 45 to 64; and 14.5% were 65 years of age or older. The gender makeup of the city was 49.5% male and 50.5% female.

2000 census
As of the census of 2000, there were 59,607 people, 23,969 households, and 15,220 families residing in the city. The population density was 1,336.7 people per square mile (516.1/km2). There were 25,096 housing units at an average density of 562.8 per square mile (217.3/km2). The racial makeup of the city was 84.33% White, 0.97% African American, 10.14% Native American, 1.0% Asian, 0.06% Pacific Islander, 0.73% from other races, and 2.77% from two or more races. Hispanic or Latino of any race were 2.77% of the population.

There were 23,969 households, out of which 31.2% had children under the age of 18 living with them, 46.7% were married couples living together, 12.6% had a female householder with no husband present, and 36.5% were non-families. 29.4% of all households were made up of individuals, and 10.0% had someone living alone who was 65 years of age or older. The average household size was 2.39 and the average family size was 2.96.

In the city, the population was spread out, with 25.3% under the age of 18, 11.8% from 18 to 24, 28.7% from 25 to 44, 20.9% from 45 to 64, and 13.2% who were 65 years of age or older. The median age was 35 years. For every 100 females, there were 96.2 males. For every 100 females age 18 and over, there were 93.6 males.

As of 2000 the median income for a household in the city was $35,978, and the median income for a family was $44,818. Males had a median income of $30,985 versus $21,913 for females. The per capita income for the city was $19,445. About 9.4% of families and 12.7% of the population were below the poverty line, including 17.6% of those under age 18 and 6.9% of those age 65 or over.

Healthcare
Rapid City is a major healthcare center for a five-state region, centered around Monument Health Rapid City Hospital, which operates under the not-for-profit parent company Monument Health, a member of The Mayo Clinic Care Network, Monument Health continues to operate independently and is governed by a volunteer board of directors. 
Monument Health Rapid City Hospital has the busiest Emergency Department in South Dakota with 57,000 visits annually, they are a certified level 2 Trauma Center. 
Monument Health offers care in 33 medical specialties and serves 20 communities across western South Dakota and in eastern Wyoming. With over 4,500 physicians and caregivers, Monument Health consists of 5 hospitals, 8 specialty and surgical centers and more than 40 medical clinics and health care service centers. In 2017 Monument Health Rapid City Hospital received recognition as one of "America's Best 250 Hospitals for Clinical Excellence" by Healthgrades, only 258 hospitals in the United States received the prestigious award, which equals out to be just 5% of hospitals in the entire country.

There are several Urgent Care facilities in Rapid City, mainly operated by Monument Health and private for-profit groups. Monument Health has the only nationally accredited Urgent Care centers in the entire state of South Dakota.

Other independent, for-profit medical facilities have been established in the area, centered around Black Hills Surgical Hospital, which is majority owned (54.2% ownership) by Medical Facilities Corporation, a for-profit Canadian holdings company, they trade on the Toronto Stock Exchange under the symbol DR. Black Hills Neurosurgery and spine, Black Hills Orthopedics, Ballard Gynecology, ProMotion Physical Therapy, Rapid City Medical Center, Rushmore OB/GYN, The Rehab Doctors and West River ENT are all either owner by, operated or affiliated with Black Hills Surgical Hospital and for-profit parent company MFC. Other private for-profit groups exist such as Black Hills Pediatrics, Black Hills Eye Institute, as well as local, smaller providers.

Specialized government health facilities include the Indian Health Service’s Oyate Health Center (formerly Sioux San Hospital), which provides care to the Native American community, and Veterans Affairs hospitals located nearby at Fort Meade and Hot Springs, South Dakota. The VA also has a small, outpatient clinic in Rapid City.

Emergency medical services (EMS) are provided by the Rapid City Fire Department. Emergency medical transportation by rotor and fixed wing aircraft is provided by Black Hills Life Flight, operated by Air Methods Corp. based in Denver, Colorado, and MARC (Medical Air Rescue Company), owned by Dale Aviation and based in Rapid City. Apollo Air Methods also operates Medical Helicopters in the Black Hills area.

This is also the location of a number of non-profit public health organizations that engage in survey and clinic research, epidemiology, and area-based health promotion disease prevention. The Health Education and Promotion Council and Black Hills Center for American Indian Health are two notable non-profit organizations.

Education

The Rapid City Public Library is a major resource for education.

Rapid City institutions of higher education include the South Dakota School of Mines and Technology, Oglala Lakota College's He Sapa College Center, Black Hills State University - Rapid City University Center (includes classes and degrees through five other South Dakota post-secondary Institutions), National American University, Western Dakota Technical Institute, Black Hills Beauty College, John Witherspoon College, and several small sectarian preacher training schools.

Black Hills State University is located in nearby Spearfish and offers several classes in Rapid City. A South Dakota State University nurse training program is based in Rapid City.

In 2013, 26.6% of Rapid City residents 25 or older had earned a bachelor's degree or higher. This is on par with the average educational attainment in the United States. The highest rates of educational attainment in South Dakota can be found in metropolitan areas of Rapid City and Sioux Falls.

The local public schools fall under the Rapid City Area Schools school district. There are three high schools within the district: Rapid City Central High School; Stevens High School; and Rapid City High School, which also houses the Performing Arts Center. The middle schools include East, North, South, Southwest, and West. There are 16 elementary schools within the district. These are Black Hawk, Canyon Lake, Corral Drive, General Beadle, Grandview, Horace Mann, Kibben Kuster, Knollwood Heights, Meadowbrook, Pinedale, Rapid Valley, Robbinsdale, South Canyon, South Park, Valley View, and Woodrow Wilson.

There are also various private schools in Rapid City. The city has four Christian high schools: Saint Thomas More, Rapid City Christian High School, Liberty Baptist Academy, and Open Bible Christian School. Rapid City also has various private grade schools, including St. Paul's Lutheran School of the WELS.

Sports

Active teams
 The Rapid City Rush is a minor league ice hockey team in the ECHL.
 American Legion Baseball has two teams, Post 22 and Post 320.
 The Expedition League, a summer collegiate baseball league, is headquartered in Rapid City, although no teams currently play there.
 The Champions Indoor Football league Rapid City Marshals began playing in Rapid City in 2022

Defunct teams
 The Black Hills Posse was a professional basketball club that competed in the International Basketball Association beginning in the 1995–96 season.
 The Black Hills Gold was a professional basketball club that competed in the International Basketball Association during the 1999–2000 season.
 The Rapid City Flying Aces were an indoor football team that competed between 2000 and 2006 in the Indoor Football League, United Indoor Football, and National Indoor Football League, changing names from season to season.
 The Rapid City Thrillers were a professional basketball club that competed in the Continental Basketball Association beginning in the 1987–88 season through the 1996–97 season.

Other teams and events
 Rapid City has two public high schools who field teams that compete in the SDHSAA, as well as two private schools.
 The South Dakota Mines Hardrockers field 13 total varsity sports that compete at the NCAA Division II level in the Rocky Mountain Athletic Conference.
 The Lakota Nation Invitational has been held annually at the Rushmore Plaza Civic Center since 1979.

Art and culture
Because of the importance of tourism in the area, and its extensive market area, Rapid City has many cultural resources usually found only in much larger urban areas. Among these are:

 The Journey Museum and Learning Center
 Museum of Geology
 Dahl Arts Center
 Suzie Cappa Art Center
 The Monument
 Black Hills Playhouse
 Storybook Island Theater
 Art Alley Gallery
 The Performing Arts Center of Rapid City
 Black Hills Community Theatre
 Black Hills Symphony Orchestra
 Black Hills Chamber Orchestra
 Prairie Edge Art Gallery
 Chapel in the Hills
 Main Street Square

Rapid City has invested in public sculptures, which are on display in many parts of the city. The most visible is "The City of Presidents", a series of life-sized bronze statues representing each former President of the United States. The statues are located on street corners in the downtown area. Five South Dakota artists created the statues: Edward E. Hlavka, Lee Leuning, John Lopez, James Michael Maher, and James Van Nuys. The first 42 statues were erected via private donations over a ten-year period between 2000 and 2010. As of 2019, Barack Obama is the most recent president to have a statue erected; currently sitting presidents are ineligible.

Sister cities

  Apolda, Thuringia, Germany
  Nikkō, Tochigi, Japan
  Yangshuo County, Guangxi, China

Industry and economy
Rapid City's economy is diverse, but industry is a small portion. Heavy and medium industrial activities include a Portland cement plant (constructed and owned for 84 years by the State of South Dakota and sold in 2003 to Grupo Cementos de Chihuahua, or GCC, a Mexican-based conglomerate); Black Hills Ammunition, an ammunition and reloading supplies manufacturing company; several custom sawmills, a lime plant, a computer peripheral component manufacturing plant, and several farm and ranch equipment manufacturers. Of particular note, this city is the center for the manufacture of Black Hills gold jewelry, a popular product with tourists and Westerners in general. The city is the site of the only American manufacturer of stamping machines used for the labeling of plywood and chipboard products.

Most gold mining has ceased in the Black Hills and was never conducted in or near Rapid City. Regional mining operations include for sand and gravel, as well as the raw materials for lime and Portland cement (including chemical-grade limestone, taconite iron ore, and gypsum) remains an important part of the economy.

The largest sector of the Rapid City economy is government services, including local, state, and federal. Major employers include Ellsworth Air Force Base, home of the 28th Bomb Wing flying the B-1B long-range bomber; the Army National Guard based at Camp Rapid and hosting annual exercises in the Black Hills, drawing troops from five to ten states; and various federal agencies, including the National Park Service, US Forest Service, and Indian Health Service.

Monument Health covers one of the largest geographic service areas in the United States. The health care sector employs more than 8,000 persons in the Rapid City area.

Tourism constitutes a major portion of the Rapid City economy, due to the proximity of Mount Rushmore, Sturgis, home of the Sturgis Motorcycle Rally; Deadwood, and other attractions in the Black Hills. This city provides most services for the Motorcycle Rally. Prepared to satisfy the Rally's demand for motel rooms, camp sites, and other services for tourists during the first week of August, Rapid City has the capacity to host other large events, such as conventions, and numerous associated tourists year-round. Various minor tourist attractions, including wildlife parks, specialty shops, caves, water parks, private museums, and other businesses are found in and near Rapid City.

Other economic sectors include financial service and investing companies such as Waddell and Reed, Citibank, WaMu, Merrill Lynch, and Northwestern Mutual. Rapid City is the headquarters for Assurant Insurance's pre-need division. As noted, the city has a strong medical services sector, and several institutions of higher education. Rapid City is also the major market town for much of five states, drawing commerce from more than half of South Dakota, and large portions of North Dakota, Montana, Wyoming, and the Nebraska Panhandle.

The real compound annual growth rate of the gross domestic product of the Rapid City Metropolitan Statistical Area was 2.6% for 2001–2013.

Transportation

Public Transit
Rapid City is served by Rapid City Rapid Ride, which provides fixed route and demand response service to the region.

Air
Rapid City is a major transportation hub for the Northern Plains. Rapid City Regional Airport provides flights to the airline hub cities of Denver, Minneapolis, Salt Lake City, Dallas-Fort Worth, Las Vegas, Phoenix/Mesa, Houston, Atlanta and Chicago. The airport also has extensive General Aviation operations, including wildfire fighting activities, and medical flight support to Rapid City medical facilities and regional Indian Health Service operations.

Railroad
Historically, Rapid City was served by three railroads. Following extensive restructuring in the industry in the late 20th and early 21st centuries, the city is now served only by the Rapid City, Pierre and Eastern Railroad (RCP&E). In addition to Rapid City, the RCP&E serves the Northern Black Hills and run east to Minnesota and south through Nebraska to connect with major transcontinental railroads Burlington Northern Santa Fe and Union Pacific. Until the 1950s Chicago and Northwestern Railroad ran a daily passenger train from Chicago to Rapid City. Neither South Dakota nor Wyoming have any Amtrak service.

Road
Rapid City's central location on the continent enables it to transport products to both coasts, and points in between. Trucking is a major business activity in the city. Improved connections with Denver and I-80 to the south, via the Heartland Expressway now under construction, will primarily benefit local trucking.

Infrastructure

 Interstate 90 is the primary east–west route for Rapid City. The city is served by a series of 7 exits. I-90 skims the northern side of the city. The South Dakota DOT has been reconstructing most of these interchanges in the last five years.
 Interstate 190 is an Interstate spur linking downtown Rapid City to Interstate 90.
 US Highway 16 is the main route to the southwest and the Black Hills from Rapid City. It links Rapid City to Custer, then west to Newcastle, Wyoming, where it connects to US Highway 85 for travel to Cheyenne and Denver. Reconstructed in the mid-1960s as a four-lane parkway connecting Rapid City to Mount Rushmore, since 2008 major segments have been rebuilt as three-lane, or "super-two" highways, to support increased tourist traffic.
 South Dakota Highway 44 is a state highway that links the interior of the Black Hills to the southwest of Rapid City, and the Pine Ridge Indian Reservation and nearby areas in the Great Plains to the southeast.
 South Dakota Highway 79 is a state highway that is multiplexed with I-90 northwest of Rapid City. SD Highway 79 extends to North Dakota. South of Rapid City to Nebraska, Highway 79 is being reconstructed as the Heartland Expressway, a high-speed, four-lane highway that will eventually connect to Interstate 80 in Nebraska and the Colorado Front Range near Denver. The Heartland Expressway may eventually be extended along US Highway 85 north to Regina, Saskatchewan, to create an additional major north–south artery through the Great Plains that would pass through Rapid City.

Rapid City is located on the boundary of the Western and Eastern power grids. It is served by the hydroelectric plants of the two Mainstem dams on the Missouri River, and the large coal fields and power plants of the Powder River Basin of Wyoming. It is located where the two national power grids connect with each other, allowing switching of electrical power from east to west and vice versa. Rapid City had its own coal-fired power plant but could not afford to meet current air pollution standards and closed it. Closed for similar reasons were coal-fired power stations near Gillette, Wyoming. The Ben French power station located within city boundaries shut down September 2012, more than two years ahead of its scheduled shutdown. Rapid City now obtains much of its power from the Missouri dams and importing it from elsewhere. Following the shut down of the plants dependent on cheap, polluting coal, electrical rates have risen. The city has had to spend more to import electricity over a longer distance.

The heavy dependence on shallow alluvial aquifers is of some concern to planners, as most suburbs of Rapid City use septic systems for domestic sewage treatment. However, water supplies remain relatively good for future growth.

Rapid City has a municipally owned bus service, providing multiple bus stops and a headquarters in the city. It has limited city-to-city bus service along I-90. Charter bus services operate in the area, connecting Rapid City and Deadwood with cities in Colorado, Nebraska, and Iowa.

Suburbs
The population of the Rapid City metropolitan statistical area (Pennington and Meade Counties) was 139,074 at the 2020 census. Rapid City is also included in the Rapid City-Spearfish combined statistical area, which, with the addition of Lawrence County, had a 2020 census population of 164,842. Many residents of cities and towns in the Black Hills and nearby plains commute to Rapid City for work. Increasingly, some Rapid City residents commute to outlying areas for work.

Among the nearer suburbs in Pennington and Meade counties are:

 Ajax
 Ashland Heights
 Blackhawk
 Box Elder
 Caputa
 Colonial Pine Hills
 Doty Spring
 Ellsworth Air Force Base
 Green Valley
 Hermosa
 Hisega
 Johnson Siding
 Nemo 
 Piedmont
 Rapid Valley
 Rimrock Area
 Rockerville
 Keystone
 Schaeferville
 Summerset
 Warbonnet

Local media

AM radio

FM radio

Television

 KOTA-TV 3 ABC, 3.2 Circle, 3.3 True Crime Network (ATSC 7), 3.4 GRIT TV
 KEVN-LD 7 Fox (ATSC 23)
 KBHE-TV 9 PBS, 9.2 World Channel, 9.3 Create, 9.4 PBS Kids (ATSC 26)
 KCLO-TV 15 CBS, 15.2 CW, 15.3 Ion Television, 15.4 Court TV Mystery (ATSC 16)
 KNBN 21 NBC, 21.2 MyNetworkTV/YouTube America
 KHME 23 MeTV, 23.2 Heroes & Icons, 23.3 Start TV, 23.4 Decades
 KRPC-LP 33 Heartland, 33.2 Retro TV, 33.3 Rev'n, 33.4 Action Channel, 33.5 The Family Channel,33.6 religious, 33.7 Jewelry TV

Print

 Black Hills Visitor Magazine (since 1984)
 Black Hills Bride
 Black Hills Parent
 Rapid City Journal
 Patriot (Ellsworth AFB Bulletin)

Places of interest

 Dinosaur Park
 Hart Ranch
 Reptile Gardens
 Bear Country USA
 Storybook Island
 Watiki Waterpark
 Berlin Wall in Memorial Park
 South Dakota School of Mines and Technology
 The Journey Museum and Gardens
 Rapid City Public Library
 Rushmore Mall
 Rushmore Tramway Adventures
 Main Street Square

Notable people

People who were born or have resided in Rapid City, South Dakota. 

 Catherine Bach – actress
 Emily Montague Mulkin Bishop – public servant and author
 Dave Collins – professional baseball player
 Jessi Combs – professional car racer and television figure
 Sean Doolittle – professional baseball player
 Mark Ellis – professional baseball player
 Meryle Fitzgerald – professional baseball player
 Jack van der Geest – Holocaust survivor and author 
 Emily Graslie – journalist
 Dick Green – professional baseball player
 Bill Groethe – photographer who photographed the last eight survivors of the Battle of the Little Bighorn
 David Hallberg – ballet dancer
 Becky Hammon – basketball coach
 John Sherrill Houser – painter and sculptor
 Carrie Ingalls – younger sister of author Laura Ingalls Wilder
 Tomi Lahren - political commentator
 Lawrence Lessig – law professor, co-founder of the Creative Commons
 Randy Lewis – Olympic wrestler
 Eric Piatkowski – former professional basketball player
 Anthony Allen Shore – serial killer
 Neal Tapio – campaign director
 Kelvin Torve– professional baseball player
 Marty Two Bulls Sr – editorial cartoonist
 Shane Van Boening – professional billiards player, 9-ball world champion 2022
 Adam Vinatieri – professional football player
 Rosebud Yellow Robe – Native American folklorist, educator and author

Notes

References

Bibliography

External links

 Rapid City government website
 Rapid City Visitors Bureau

 
Black Hills
Cities in South Dakota
Cities in Pennington County, South Dakota
County seats in South Dakota
Populated places established in 1876
Rapid City, South Dakota metropolitan area
1876 establishments in Dakota Territory